James Murphy (30 May 1923 – 1 December 2021), better known as Jas Murphy, was an Irish Gaelic footballer. He played at club level with Garda and at inter-county level with the Cork and Kerry senior football teams. He captained Kerry to the 1953 All-Ireland Championship.

Career
Murphy first played Gaelic football with the Kerins O'Rahilly's club in Tralee. He later lined out with the Garda club in Cork and was part of their 1950 County Championship-winning team. Murphy first appeared on the inter-county scene after declaring for the Cork senior football team. After two seasons with his adopted team, he subsequently joined the Kerry senior football team in 1949. Murphy won the first of two Munster Championship titles in 1950 and assumed the team captaincy for the 1953 All-Ireland final after Paudie Sheehy was dropped from the team. He ended the game with a winners' medal and lifted the Sam Maguire Cup after the defeat of Armagh. Murphy himself was dropped from the team before the 1954 Munster final.

Personal life
Born in Tralee, County Kerry, Murphy was the son of RIC double agent Jim Murphy. After joining the Garda Síochána, he eventually reached the rank of Detective Garda and was based in Union Quay in Cork from 1943 until his retirement in 1985.

Murphy died on 1 December 2021, at the age of 98.

Honours
Garda
Cork Senior Football Championship: 1950

Kerry
All-Ireland Senior Football Championship: 1953 (c)
Munster Senior Football Championship: 1950, 1953 (c)

References

1923 births
2021 deaths
All-Ireland-winning captains (football)
Cork inter-county Gaelic footballers
Garda (Cork) Gaelic footballers
Garda Síochána officers
Kerins O'Rahilly's Gaelic footballers
Kerry inter-county Gaelic footballers
Munster inter-provincial Gaelic footballers
People from Tralee
St Nicholas' Gaelic footballers
Winners of one All-Ireland medal (Gaelic football)